Abel Ladaveze was an Irish Anglican clergyman.

He was born in Dublin, and educated at Trinity College Dublin. He was Archdeacon of Cashel from 1767 until his death a year later.

References 

1767 deaths
Irish Anglicans
Archdeacons of Cashel
Year of birth missing
Alumni of Trinity College Dublin
Christian clergy from Dublin (city)